Oleh Danchenko (born 1 August 1994) is a Ukrainian professional footballer who plays as a right-back for Zorya Luhansk, on loan from Greek side AEK Athens.

Career
Danchenko is a product of the youth team systems of FC Metalurh Zaporizhya. He made his debut for FC Chornomorets in a game against SC Tavriya Simferopol on 22 March 2014 in the Ukrainian Premier League.

In February 2016, he signed a contract with Shakhtar Donetsk, but remained to play on loan for the half-year term in FC Chornomorets.

On 31 January 2019, he joined FC Yenisey Krasnoyarsk on loan until the end of the 2018–19 season.

On 15 June 2019, he signed a four-year contract with Rubin Kazan. For 2020–21 season, a new limit of 8 foreign players was introduced in the Russian Premier League, and was not registered by the club with the league. On 15 August 2020, he joined Ufa on loan with an option to purchase.

On 31 January 2021, AEK Athens officially announced the signing of Danchenko on a contract running until the summer of 2024.
On 14 January 2022 when he signed his contract with Zorya Luhansk, his wife was killed in a road accident.

Career statistics

Club

Notes

References

External links

 
 

1994 births
Living people
Ukrainian footballers
Ukraine under-21 international footballers
FC Chornomorets Odesa players
FC Dynamo Khmelnytskyi players
Ukrainian Premier League players
FC Shakhtar Donetsk players
Association football midfielders
FC Anzhi Makhachkala players
Ukrainian expatriate footballers
Expatriate footballers in Russia
Ukrainian expatriate sportspeople in Russia
Russian Premier League players
FC Yenisey Krasnoyarsk players
FC Rubin Kazan players
FC Ufa players
AEK Athens F.C. players
FC Zorya Luhansk players
Expatriate footballers in Greece
Ukrainian expatriate sportspeople in Greece